Michael Geier (born March 12, 1965), known as Big Mike Geier, is a singer and entertainer based in Atlanta, Georgia, U.S. Geier has garnered international fame through his most critically acclaimed act: a Pagliacci-type clown alter ego named Puddles Pity Party. As Puddles, Geier has toured North America, Europe, and Australia; and has released content under the Puddles moniker since 2013. Geier is well known in the Atlanta entertainment circuit, having garnered a reputation for himself through his Elvis Presley-themed Christmas shows and charity events, and he has also collaborated with musical acts like Scott Bradlee's Postmodern Jukebox. Geier now performs almost exclusively as Puddles, and he also refers to Puddles in third person when speaking about the character.

Biography
Geier was born in Philadelphia, Pennsylvania, United States, the fifth of seven children of "Big Oz" and Peg Geier. He says that he "grew up in a houseful of giants", with his two brothers and four sisters all growing to at least  in height. He grew up in Richmond, Virginia. Living in, and based in Atlanta, Georgia since 1995, Geier is married to his business partner, Shannon Newton.

In the early 1990s, Geier led a touring "Swing Noir" band, The Useless Playboys, before settling in Atlanta in 1995. Around this time, Geier started up an Elvis tribute band, Kingsized. Several years into Kingsized, Geier began experimenting with a clown-themed side project called Greasepaint, which laid the foundation for his later alter ego, Puddles.

Puddles Pity Party
In 1998, Geier decided to found a clown-themed band with several other Atlanta-based musicians. Having named himself Puddles in the band, this collaborative project would eventually break up; but would lay the foundation for his solo project Puddles Pity Party. Puddles' original appearance was mostly non specific, but eventually developed into adorning a whiteface clown costume. Geier refers to Puddles in third person while speaking about the character, and will also refer to himself as Mike in third person while performing as Puddles. Like Geier himself, Puddles has a baritone singing voice, and sings mostly covers of songs. Puddles has a depressed persona and refrains from speaking on stage or giving interviews. His shows include a mix of silent prop comedy, mime, and audience participation with songs interplayed throughout creating a narrative structure. Puddles Pity Party's first performance as an independent act  was an experiment for Aqua Teen Hunger Forces 2010 tour. Initially skeptical if his singing clown character would be well-received, Geier stated that his wife convinced him to continue with the act after his premiere performance garnered an overwhelmingly positive response from the audience.

In 2011, Geier appeared regularly at the Manderley Bar in New York's immersive theater show Sleep No More. In 2012, he moved to Seattle to appear in a European-style vaudevillian cabaret, Teatro ZinZanni. In 2013, he opened for Eels during their U.S. and European tour.

In October 2013, Geier recorded a cover of Lorde's "Royals" with Postmodern Jukebox on YouTube. , the video has been viewed over 32 million times. Lorde declared his cover to be her favorite cover of "Royals". Two more versions of Royals, in a "punk" style and in a "new-wave" style appeared in the later part of 2020. Puddles has collaborated with Bradlee on YouTube several times since.

Since 2014, Geier has toured the world, playing concerts in the United States, United Kingdom, Belgium, and Australia.
On September 27, 2014, his live performance of Leonard Cohen's "Hallelujah", at the Regency Ballroom in San Francisco, was filmed by director Gary Yost and was later described by HuffPost as "a strange kind of beautiful".  the video on YouTube had received over 8.7 million views.

In 2017, Geier, as Puddles, participated in season 12 of the reality series America's Got Talent. He advanced to the quarterfinals at the Dolby Theatre, where he performed his version of "Royals" and received an "X" from Simon Cowell. He was ultimately eliminated the following night. In October 2017 Geier, as Puddles, made an appearance in a Cartoon Network ad promoting new episodes of Teen Titans Go! and OK K.O.! Let's Be Heroes. Geier previously collaborated with Cartoon Network's Sunday Pants series writing music for the show as well as playing the Slacks' band leader in the live action segments.

In January 2019 Geier, as Puddles, began a headline act residency at Caesars Palace, Las Vegas, Nevada.

In 2022, Geier, as Puddles, made a guest appearance on the season 4 season finale of The Conners.

Discography

With Postmodern Jukebox
 2015, Top Hat on Fleek, Scott Bradlee's Postmodern Jukebox: "Mad World" and "Viva la Vida"
 2016, The Essentials, Scott Bradlee's Postmodern Jukebox: "Royals"

As Puddles Pity Party
Albums
 Holiday Jubilee, Not On Label (Puddles Pity Party self-released), 2018		
 You Down?, Not On Label (Puddles Pity Party self-released), 2018		

Singles & EPs
 Royals (Postmodern Jukebox, featuring Puddles Pity Party), Not On Label, 2014		
 Space Oddity/Life On Mars?, Sympathy For The Record Industry, 2019

As Mike Geier
Music composed and performed by Geier has appeared in television shows including iCarly and Victorious. In 2022, Geier's cover of Blink 182's All The Small Things was featured on the John Lewis Christmas advert.

References

External links 
 
 

American baritones
American clowns
American mimes
Musical groups from Atlanta
American YouTubers
21st-century American singers
America's Got Talent contestants
Living people
1964 births
21st-century American male singers